A Q-machine is a device that is used in experimental plasma physics. 
The name Q-machine stems from the original intention of creating a 
quiescent plasma that is free from the fluctuations that are 
present in plasmas created in electric discharges. The Q-machine 
was first described in a publication by Rynn and D'Angelo.

The Q-machine plasma is created at a plate that has been heated 
to about 2000 K and hence is called the hot plate. Electrons are 
emitted by the hot plate through thermionic emission, and ions 
are created through contact ionization of atoms of alkali metals 
that have low ionisation potentials. The hot plate is made of a 
metal that has a large work function and can withstand high 
temperatures, e.g. tungsten or rhenium. The alkali metal is 
boiled in an oven that is designed to direct a beam of alkaline 
metal vapour onto the hot plate. A high value of the hot plate 
work function and a low ionisation potential of the metal makes 
for a low potential barrier for an electron in the alkaline metal 
to overcome, thus making the ionisation process more efficient. 
Sometimes barium is used instead of an alkaline metal due to its 
excellent spectroscopic properties. The fractional ionization of a Q-machine plasma can approach unity, which can be orders of magnitude greater than that predicted by the Saha ionization equation.

The temperature of the Q-machine plasma is close to the temperature 
of the hot plate, and the ion and electron temperatures are similar. 
Although this temperature (about 2000 K) is high compared to room 
temperature, it is much lower than electron temperatures that are 
usually found in discharge plasma. 
The low temperature makes it possible to create a plasma column that 
is several ion gyro radii across. Since the alkaline metals are 
solids at room temperature they will stick to the walls of the 
machine on impact, and therefore the neutral pressure can be kept 
so low that for all practical purposes the plasma is fully ionised.

Plasma research that has been performed using Q-machines 
includes current driven ion cyclotron waves, 
Kelvin-Helmholtz waves, and electron phase space 
holes.

Today, Q-machines can be found at West Virginia University and at 
the University of Iowa in the USA, at Tohoku University in Sendai 
in Japan, and at the University of Innsbruck in Austria.

See also
List of plasma (physics) articles

References 

Plasma physics